Marilyn Little (born December 1, 1981) is an American eventing and show jumping rider. Little won both individual and team gold medals in eventing at the 2015 Pan American Games in Toronto.

CCI 4* Results

References

1981 births
Living people
American female equestrians
Equestrians at the 2015 Pan American Games
Pan American Games gold medalists for the United States
Pan American Games medalists in equestrian
Medalists at the 2015 Pan American Games
21st-century American women